Abu Faris Abd al-Aziz II (reigned 1394–1434) was a Hafsid Caliph of Ifriqiya.

Life 
He proceeded to further consolidate the kingdom after his father Abu al-Abbas Ahmad II had restored its integrity. A strong monarch and an orthodox Muslim he abolished some taxes he deemed incompatible with the teachings of Qur'an, using instead privateer actions against Christian shipping as a way to raise state income. He intervened against his western neighbors, the Zayyanid dynasty of the Kingdom of Tlemcen, and in Andalusia as well.

Sources 

Year of birth unknown
1434 deaths
14th-century Hafsid caliphs
15th-century Hafsid caliphs